The 2013 SAFF Championship Final was the final match of the 2013 SAFF Championship which took place in Nepal on Wednesday, September 11, 2013, and was officiated by Tayeb Hasan Shamsuzzaman of Bangladesh. It was the 10th installment of the tournament since its inception in 1993.

This final was the first time a final was repeated in the SAFF Championship and such this was a repeat final of the 2011 SAFF Championship in which India thrashed Afghanistan 4–0 in India. However, in this final Afghanistan won with goals coming from Mustafa Azadzoy and Sandjar Ahmadi in the 9th and 62nd minute respectively. This would be Afghanistan's first SAFF Championship win after losing in the 2011 SAFF Championship in the final to India.

Road to the final

India entered the 2013 SAFF Championship as the reigning champion after defeating Afghanistan in the 2011 SAFF Championship. Afghanistan's best record previous was runners-up in the 2011 SAFF Championship.

To the final, India struggled through and scraped by the group stage through head-to-edge edging out Pakistan from an own-goal by Samar Ishaq in a 1–0 win to the Indians. Later in the semi-finals, against Maldives, it took India until the 86th minute when Arnab Mondal opened the scoring to leave it a 1–0 win to proceed to the final.

Afghanistan, on the other hand, breezed by both Sri Lanka and Bhutan in the group stage with comfortable wins and a 0-0 stalemate with Maldives. To proceed to the final, Afghanistan won convincingly in a 1–0 win against the hosts Nepal with the lone goal coming from Sandjar Ahmadi in the 11th minute.

India entered the tournament as favorites to win but as matches progressed, many thought otherwise. Afghanistan entered the final as clear favorites to win, before the match, due to their journey and having their highest FIFA ranking, at the time, of 139. India, however, barely scraped by to the final and had a FIFA ranking of 145.

Squads 

During the tournament, Afghanistan had the most diverse squad. While most other nations had almost all players playing for their domestic league, Afghanistan had five players playing outside of Asia with four in Europe and the rest in either India's I-League or its domestic league the Afghan Premier League. The average age of the Lions of Khorasan was 26 years of age with goalkeeper Hamidullah Yosufzai the oldest at 31 and youngest being Sidiq Walizada at 21.

India had all its players playing in its domestic I-League with four players being free agents. The average age of the Blue Tigers was 26 years of age, as well, with goalkeeper Sandip Nandy the oldest at 38 and Sandesh Jhingan the youngest at 20.

Match officials 

Tayeb Shamsuzzaman of the Bangladesh was appointed the referee of the final and was assisted by Pakistani Moaid Al Sayeg and Issa Mahmoud Ahmad Al Amawi of Jordan. The fourth official was Adham Makhadmeh, also from Jordan.

Shamsuzzaman was listed as a FIFA referee in 1999. Since then, he had experience as a referee in the World Cup Qualifiers (AFC), AFC Cup, AFC Champions League, WAFF Championship and AFF Suzuki Cup.

Prior to the final, he refereed for five other games in the 2013 SAFF Championship. He was referee in Afghanistan-Bhutan and Bhutan-Maldives matches in Group A before moving to the Group B match India-Nepal. Then finishing the group stage by being the referee for Afghanistan-Maldives and the semi-final of Maldives-India.

In the games that Shamsuzzaman was the referee, he showed no more than two yellow cards in every game with that being Bhutan-Maldives and Afghanistan-Maldives. He gave the red card in the group-stage match between Bhutan national football team and Maldives national football team and giving the Bhutan goalkeeper Leki Dukpa a red card for tripping Ali Ashfaq just outside the penalty box after rushing to a one-on-one.

Details

References 

SAFF Championship Finals
1
2013
2013
Afghanistan at the 2013 SAFF Championship
SAFF
September 2013 sports events in Asia